Metalegoceras is an extinct genus of marine cephalopods belonging to the family Schistoceratidae.

Species
 Metalegoceras ajdaralense
 Metalegoceras arcticum
 Metalegoceras aricki
 Metalegoceras australe
 Metalegoceras baylorense
 Metalegoceras crenatum
 Metalegoceras evolutum
 Metalegoceras hudsoni
 Metalegoceras kayi
 Metalegoceras klimovi
 Metalegoceras liratum
 Metalegoceras pamiricum
 Metalegoceras platyventrum
 Metalegoceras rotundatum
 Metalegoceras schucherti
 Metalegoceras shangraoense
 Metalegoceras shyndense
 Metalegoceras sogurense
 Metalegoceras spirale
 Metalegoceras striatum
 Metalegoceras sundaicum
 Metalegoceras toumanskayae
 Metalegoceras tschernyschewi

Distribution
This species have been found in the Permian of Australia, Canada, China, East Timor, Indonesia, Kazakhstan, Malaysia, Oman, Russia and United States.

References

 The Paleobiology Database
 F. A. H . W . De Marez Ovens  On Paralegoceras sundaicum Haniel and related forms  (1933)

External links
 The Fossil Forum 

Goniatitida genera
Neoicoceratoidea
Permian animals of Asia
Paleozoic life of Nunavut
Paleozoic life of Yukon